Donovan Kennedy Williams (born September 6, 2001) is an American professional basketball player for the Atlanta Hawks of the National Basketball Association (NBA), on a two-way contract with the College Park Skyhawks of the NBA G League. He played college basketball for the Texas Longhorns and the UNLV Runnin' Rebels. Listed at 6 ft 6 in (1.98 m) and 190 lb (86 kg), he plays the shooting guard position.

Early life and high school career
Williams grew up in Houston, Texas and attended Elkins High School. He entered college as a four-star prospect and was ranked No. 61 overall in the country by Rivals. His team won back-to-back district championships and he was named the district MVP. He was also a two-time first team all-district selection and two-time all-state team member. He averaged 18.2 points per contest while leading Elkins to a 31-8 record and a trip to the Class 6A regional semifinals as a senior. He averaged 13.2 points per game while helping Elkins to a 29-12 mark and a trip to the Class 5A state quarterfinals as a junior.

College career
Williams started his college career at the University of Texas, and appeared in 26 games, making one start, averaged 11.0 minutes played per contest, averaged 3.3 points and 1.0 rebounds per game. He tallied a career-high 13 points twice during his freshman year and was named to the 2020 Academic All-Big 12 Men's Basketball Rookie Team. He later suffered a left knee injury at Texas Tech and missed the remainder of the season. During his sophomore year, he appeared in 15 games, averaging 10.1 minutes per contest. He scored 3.3 points per game with 1.1 rebounds per game and scored a season-high 11 points vs. Oklahoma. Selected to the 2021 Academic All-Big 12 Second Team. Williams transferred to the University of Nevada, Las Vegas for his junior year. On June 1, 2022, Williams declared for the 2022 NBA draft.

Professional career

Long Island Nets (2022–2023)
After going undrafted in the 2022 NBA draft, on October 19, 2022, Williams signed a contract with the Long Island Nets.

Atlanta Hawks (2023–present)
On January 17, 2023, Williams signed a two-way contract with the Atlanta Hawks, splitting time with their NBA G League affiliate, College Park Skyhawks.

Career statistics

NBA G League

Regular season

|-
| style="text-align:left;"| 2022–23
| style="text-align:left;"| Long Island
| 8 || 8 || 27.2 || .495 || .417 || .615 || 2.6 || 1.4 || 1.3 || .6 || 15.6
|-
| style="text-align:left;"| 2022–23
| style="text-align:left;"| College Park
| 1 || 0 || 28.8 || .556 || .500 || .500 || 2.0 || .0 || 3.0 || 1.0 || 14.0
|- class="sortbottom"
| style="text-align:center;" colspan="2"| Career
| 9 || 8 || 27.3 || .500 || .425 || .600 || 2.6 || 1.2 || 1.4 || .7 || 15.4

College

|-
| style="text-align:left;"| 2019–20
| style="text-align:left;"| Texas
| 26 || 1 || 11.0 || .368 || .244 || .706 || 1.0 || .3 || .5 || .2 || 3.3
|-
| style="text-align:left;"| 2020–21
| style="text-align:left;"| Texas
| 15 || 0 || 10.3 || .304 || .174 || .846 || 1.1 || .3 || .3 || .2 || 3.3
|-
| style="text-align:left;"| 2021–22
| style="text-align:left;"| UNLV
| 27 || 13 || 22.1 || .488 || .436 || .638 || 3.3 || 1.1 || .7 || .4 || 12.7
|- class="sortbottom"
| style="text-align:center;" colspan="2"| Career
| 68 || 14 || 15.3 || .435 || .338 || .667 || 2.0 || .6 || .5 || .3 || 7.0

Personal life
Williams' sister, Kelsey, played in the WNBA.

References

External links
Texas Longhorns bio
UNLV Runnin' Rebels bio

2001 births
Living people
American men's basketball players
Atlanta Hawks players
Basketball players from Texas
College Park Skyhawks players
Long Island Nets players
UNLV Runnin' Rebels basketball players
People from Houston
Shooting guards
Texas Longhorns men's basketball players
Undrafted National Basketball Association players